Leucania obumbrata is a moth of the family Noctuidae. It is known from Australia.

The wingspan is about 50 mm. Adults have dark brown forewings with a fine-grained pattern. The hindwings are pale, darkening toward the margin, with dark brown veins.

The larvae are fawn and grow to a length of about 40 mm.

Adults are preyed on by Ordgarius magnificus. The spider emits a pheromone similar to that of the female to attract males, trapping them in a sticky ball of glue which the spider swings on a stretch of silk.

Taxonomy
The Checklist of Australian Lepidoptera synonymised Dasygaster nephelistis with Leucania obumbrata, but made no attempt to assign the species to a genus.

References

Leucania